UGC 9391 is a Magellanic spiral galaxy in constellation Draco. 130 million light years from Earth, it is not a member of any group of galaxies, and is moving away from the Earth at 1939 km/s.

In 2003, a supernova catalogued as SN 2003du was detected within the galaxy, with an apparent magnitude of 15.9.

References

Draco (constellation)
Barred spiral galaxies
09391